Mourigram or Maurigram is a census town located in Howrah district in the Indian state of West Bengal.

Location
Mourigram is located between Podrah and Andul. Dhuilya is also adjacent to Mourigram.

Culture and Education
Mourigram is well-known to all for Indian Oil Corporation Limited.
Beside this, also there are very few industries at Mourigram. The town is somewhat economically stable but is deprived of its primary needs for development. Most people are educated and gentle. Most of them are businessman or Government Employees.
There are few schools: Nimtala high school, Maria's day school, Oxford high school, St. Thomas school and a Law college. The nearest college is Prabhu Jagatbandhu College, which is affiliated to University of Calcutta.

Transport
Mourigram has a good connectivity to Kolkata which is 12 km by road and is 14 km from Howrah Station. Andul Road (part of Grand Trunk Road/State Highway 6) is the artery of the town. Mourigram Rail Overbridge was constructed along Andul Road in 2004 to avoid traffic jam along railway tracks and to reduce accidents.

Bus

Private Bus
 61 Alampur - Howrah Station

Mini Bus
 13 Ranihati - Rajabazar
 13A Fatikgachi - Rajabazar
 20 Alampur - Ultadanga Station
 20A Mourigram - Salt Lake Tank no. 13

Bus Routes Without Numbers
 Mourigram railway station - Barrackpur Cantonment
 Andul railway station - New Town Ecospace

Train
Mourigram railway station on Howrah-Kharagpur line serves the locality.

References

Cities and towns in Howrah district
Neighbourhoods in Kolkata
Kolkata Metropolitan Area